Jonah Abutu (born 27 July 1989) is a Nigerian footballer who plays as a midfielder for Warri Wolves F.C. He has been described as a crooked midfielder who possesses pace, good positioning and ability to provide assists. He has played for Lobi Stars of Makurdi,  Sharks FC  and Enyimba FC. He has played for Dolphins FC 

Abutu scored the winning goal in 2007 Cup of Kaduna State, which qualified the team to national stage of Nigeria Federation Cup.

References

External links 
 https://web.archive.org/web/20160304095755/http://nigerianfootballleague.com/tag/jonah-abutu/
 http://www.nigerdeltanews.com/tag/jonah-abutu/
 http://thenationonlineng.net/abutu-set-for-double-with-enyimba/

1989 births
Living people
Nigerian footballers
Association football midfielders
Taraba F.C. players
People from Maiduguri